Curtis Creek is a tidal creek located in Baltimore City and Anne Arundel County, Maryland. It is a tributary of the cove Curtis Bay and is adjacent to the west of the South Baltimore community of Curtis Bay. The creek begins at the confluence of Furnace Creek and Marley Creek in northern Anne Arundel County, Maryland and flows north about  into Curtis Bay (which now lies in the City of Baltimore) which opens to the east into the main branch and stem of the Patapsco River (serving as the Port of Baltimore) and Chesapeake Bay.

External links

NOAA nautical chart 12278
NOAA nautical chart 12281

Curtis Bay, Baltimore
Hawkins Point, Baltimore
Rivers of Anne Arundel County, Maryland
Bodies of water of Baltimore
Patapsco River
Tributaries of the Chesapeake Bay